Remmel is a surname.

Notable people with this surname include:
 Cardo Remmel, Estonian sport sailor and entrepreneur
 Laura Remmel, former name of Laura Põldvere, Estonian singer
 Lee Remmel, American sportswriter
 Peter Remmel, German swimmer
 Valentine Remmel, American politician

See also
 Remmels

Estonian-language surnames